Robert H. Halkidis (born March 5, 1966) is a Canadian former professional ice hockey player.

Playing career
As a youth, Halkidis played in the 1979 Quebec International Pee-Wee Hockey Tournament with a minor ice hockey team from Toronto.

After a junior hockey career with the London Knights in which he won the Max Kaminsky Trophy as outstanding defenceman in 1984–85, Halkidis joined the Buffalo Sabres. During his career he also played for the Los Angeles Kings, Toronto Maple Leafs, Detroit Red Wings, Tampa Bay Lightning, New York Islanders and HIFK. In 1998 Halkidis won the Finnish championship with HIFK and was very popular among fans due to his rough and uncompromising style of play. Known more as a defensive defenceman, Halkidis recorded 8 goals and 32 assists over 256 NHL games.

Personal life

He retired in 2001, and now runs a hockey training and coaching development business. He is currently a pro scout for the Columbus Blue Jackets.

His son, Beau, is an NHL/AHL referee. He made his NHL debut on April 1, 2019.

Career statistics

Regular season and playoffs

References

External links
 

1966 births
Living people
Buffalo Sabres draft picks
Buffalo Sabres players
Canadian expatriate ice hockey players in Finland
Canadian expatriate ice hockey players in Russia
Canadian ice hockey defencemen
Columbus Blue Jackets scouts
Detroit Red Wings players
HIFK (ice hockey) players
London Knights players
Los Angeles Kings players
New York Islanders players
Phoenix Roadrunners (IHL) players
Rochester Americans players
SKA Saint Petersburg players
Ice hockey people from Toronto
Tampa Bay Lightning players
Toronto Maple Leafs players